Trapezites phigalioides, commonly known as the montane ochre or phigalioides skipper, is a species of butterfly in the family Hesperiidae. It is endemic to Australia, where it occurs in New South Wales, Australian Capital Territory, Queensland and Victoria. It occurs primarily in open eucalypt forests, often overlapping with the closely related heath ocre (Trapezites phigalia).

Description 
From above, the forewings each exhibit three large yellow spots, a median yellow spot near the dorsum, a yellow dorsum streak, and a subapical band consisting of three pale yellow spots, while the hindwings each exhibit a single large band near the center of the hindwing. From below, the forewings exhibit markings similar to those above, while the hingwings exhibit roughly 12 small brown circular markings. Adult males and females appear similar.

Behaviour and life cycle 
Adults fly fast and close to the ground, readily feeding at flowers. Adult males engage in hilltopping and establish territories within a meter of the ground. Adult females lay their eggs singly on the undersides of the leaves of the species' host plant, the wattle mat-rush (Lomandra filiformis). Once hatched, the larvae construct a vertical shelter from silk and debris at the base of the host plant, resting in their shelter during the day and emerging to feed at night. Pupation occurs inside the larval shelter, with the head of the larva oriented upwards. There is a single generation each year, with adults emerging primarily in November and December.

References 

Butterflies of Australia
Insects of Australia
Hesperiidae
Trapezitinae
Butterflies described in 1903